Jonathan Ward may refer to:

Jonathan Ward (actor) (born 1970), American actor
Jonathan Ward (American football) (born 1997), American football player
Jonathan Ward (athlete), British Paralympic athlete
Jonathan Ward (politician) (1768–1842), American politician from New York

See also 
Jonny Ward, musician in Pg. 99
John Ward (disambiguation)